Football Club Desna Chernihiv is a Ukrainian football club based in Chernihiv. The original name of the club was "Avanhard" (FC Avanhard Chernihiv) during its first year of existence as part of a republican Avanhard sports society. Between 1961 and 1970 the club was called Desna. In 1972 it was replaced with SC Chernihiv (team of the SKA Kyiv) that played in Chernihiv for the next couple of years. In 1977 Desna was revived now in place of the amateur club "FC Khimik Chernihiv" that won regional competitions.

History

Original team of masters Avanhard Chernihiv 
 The team of masters was established in Chernihiv in 1960 under the name "Avanhard" as part of the republican Avanhard sports society and entering competitions of the class "B" competitions (concurrently Football Championship of the Ukrainian SSR). That year the Chernihiv team "Avanhard" would take part in the state football championship (challenge) among the Class B teams. The team was created on already existing Chernihiv city team that also was known as Avanhard and played earlier in republican level competitions.

In the season 1958, "Avanhard Chernihiv", signed Viktor Bannikov for one year, considered one of the best goalkeepers in the Soviet Union earning the title of the best twice in 1964 and 1970 and distinguished Master of Sport of USSR (1991). From 1966 to 1979 the goalkeeper was Yuriy Hruznov from Chernihiv.

In the "Avanhard Chernihiv"'s squad were included better footballers of the region (Chernihiv Oblast). Among them are goalkeeper V.Lomako, field players V.Kravchynskyi, Yu.Shkolnikov, O.Finkelberh, and others, in such way the chairman of regional council of sports societies and organizations V.Tatur informed readers of "Desnyanska Pravda" on 10 February 1960. "The team's coach is appointed a former Dynamo Kyiv player Aleksandr Shchanov. These days "Avanhard" will proceed with its training and in already the nearest future in Chernihiv will start reconstruction and upgrade of the city's stadium. In its construction will take part quite a few city residents, public, youth, and Komsomol activists". Over 26 seasons in the USSR championships, Desna played 1,099 matches, of which 380 won, 301 – tied and 418 – lost. They scored 1145 goals, conceded – 1251.

In February, "Avanhard Chernihiv" took part in the winter championship of the Chernihiv Oblast (see Chernihiv Oblast Football Federation), and the team played their first official match on April 17, 1960, in Kirovohrad against the "Zirka" (0:3). The next match, "Avanhard" held a draw with Kyivan "Arsenal" (0:0), and then lost at its home field to "Lokomotyv" out of Vinnytsia (today FC Nyva Vinnytsia) with a score of 0:6. In May 1960, Aleksandr Shchanov was dismissed. The duties of a head coach were performed by his assistant Anatoliy Zhigan, who was approved in this position in July 1960. In its first season in the USSR championship, the team took 16th place out of 17 teams in the 1st zone of the Ukrainian Class B class (second tier) and won relegation playoff against Avanhard Pryluky to stay in the league.

Name Change from "Avanhard Chernihiv" to "FC Desna Chernihiv" 
 In 1961 the team received the name "Desna". According to the results of the 1961 season, Desna took the 5th place in its group and the 10th place in the final of the Ukrainian SSR (class "B"). Among all the Ukrainian teams of the championship of the USSR Chernihiv team was the 13th.

In 1962, the team was coached by Yevgeny Goryansky and in 1965 Desna achieved its highest achievement in the Soviet Union era. Defeating six opponents, including class "A" teams – "Shinnik" and "Neftçi", the team reached the 1/8 finals of the USSR Cup, where they lost to "Kairat" in Almaty with a score 3:4. The following season, the team fought for leadership in the first zone of the Ukrainian class "B" – the winners were given the right to fight for securing the second group of the "A" class (later reorganized into the First League). "Desna" skipped forward only Khmelnitsky "Dynamo", and in the overall standings took the 4th place in the championship of the Ukrainian SSR.

In 1968, Desna, taking fourth place in the final tournament of the best Ukrainian teams of the "B" class, won a ticket to the second group of the "A" class. At the end of the 1970 season, the team took 11th place among 22 teams, but at the end of the year the decision of the new head of the Chernihiv region was to disband the club. In 1972 the city of Chernihiv was represented by a football team called the "team of Chernihiv city" and later renamed as SC Chernihiv. The team represented the Armed Forces of Kiev Military District and better known as SKA Kyiv. The 1976 season was its last season at professional level.

At the same period of time in 1976 "Khimik" Chernihiv, led by the former player of the Desna, Yukhym Shkolnykov, won the Ukrainian SSR championship among the physical culture teams, thus gaining an opportunity to participate at professional level, the Soviet Second League. In 1977 "Desna", the composition of which was formed from the former players of "Khimik" Chernihiv, entered the Soviet Second League. In the season 1981–1982 Oleh Kuznetsov, started his  career in FC Desna Chernihiv, as the family moved to Chernihiv and later he played for Dynamo Kyiv, Rangers, Maccabi Haifa and CSKA-Borysfen Kyiv, winning UEFA Cup Winners' Cup, Soviet Top League, Soviet Cup. Scottish Premier Division, Scottish League Cup, Scottish Cup with Rangers. He also got the final with Soviet Union in UEFA Euro 1988 in the West Germany with 11th and 17th places for Ballon d'Or in 1988 and 1989. In summer 1982, the club signed Oleksandr Ryabokon as defender and the team, placed 2nd in the Ukrainian zone of the Second League, won silver medals of the football championship of the Ukrainian SSR. In the season 1983–1984 the team was coached by the experience of Yevgeny Goryansky having coached Soviet Union and clubs like FC Dinamo Minsk, FC Dynamo Moscow, FC Dynamo Kyiv and FC Zenit Leningrad. In 1990 the club got into the semifinal of Cup of the Ukrainian SSR against Naftovyk Okhtyrka. In 1991 he got into the quarterfinal of Cup of the Ukrainian SSR against Kryvbas Kryvyi Rih.

Transition from Soviet competitions to Ukrainian 
 After the collapse of the Soviet Union and the proclamation of Ukraine's independence, Desna started playing in the Ukrainian First League, but in the season 1993/94 it was relegated to the third tier. The coach was Yuriy Hruznov from 1990 to 1993 and the club won the Ukrainian Second League group tournament in the season 1996–97, the team returned to the First League for two seasons. Since 1999, for seven seasons, Chernihiv footballers performed in the Second League. In the Summer 2003, the club acquired the Serbia defender Milan Zagorac and the coach was Vadym Lazorenko from 2002 to 2004. Desna got second in the Ukrainian Second League with Oleksandr Kozhemyachenko top scores with 21 goals  and the season 2005–06 finally won the and Ukrainian Second League and the club return the team to the Ukrainian First League in the season 2006–07. First League in the championship of 2005/06 mentors Olexandr Tomakh and Yukhym Shkolnykov were managed.

In summer time 2006, FC Desna signed the professional Forward Andriy Yarmolenko, who played for who played for FC Dynamo Kyiv, Borussia Dortmund and now plays for West Ham United F.C. He also played for under-21 squad for also participated in the 2008 UEFA European Under-19 Championship qualification. He later participated in qualification and finals of the 2011 UEFA European Under-21 Football Championship. With the Ukraine National Team, in the 2010 FIFA World Cup qualification game against Andorra, Yarmolenko made his first senior appearance for Ukraine and scored in a 5–0 win. On 2 September 2011, in an international friendly against Uruguay in Kharkiv, Yarmolenko set a national team record by scoring 14 seconds into the match, the fastest time in which a Ukraine national team player has scored a goal. UEFA Euro 2016 qualifying, play-off victory over Slovenia to qualify the nation for Euro 2016.

In the 2007/08 season Desna took the 4th place in the Ukrainian First League, which at that time was the best result of the team in the Ukrainian championship. In November 2008 the club's president Oleksiy Savchenko announced that he sold 50% of the club's stock for ₴10 million and the club's co-owner became Ukrainian parliamentarian of Party of Regions Pavlo Klymets who was the owner of "Olimp" company specializing in production of vodka. After the end of the 2009/10 season Desna was deprived of professional status due to the fact that it did not pass the certification, but the new authority managed to revive the team and declare it in the Second League. In the season 2011–12, the coach was Oleksandr Deriberin that brought the club at the second place in Ukrainian Second League and gained the playoff.

Promotion to Ukrainian Premier League 
In the 2012–13 season Desna won the Ukrainian Second League title and rose in the class. Following the results of the championship of 2013/14 the team took the 5th position in the First League. In the Ukrainian Cup  in the season 2013–14, the team for the first time in history reached the quarter finals, having beaten "Metalurh" Zaporizhya (1:1, in a penalty shootout – 5:4) on its field. In the match 1/4 finals with the "Shakhtar" "Desna" lost with a score of 0:2. The coach Oleksandr Ryabokon was elected best coach of the Ukrainian First League in the season 2016–17.

In the summer 2016, the club signed the striker Oleksandr Filippov, from FC Avanhard Kramatorsk and in 2016/17 season Desna won the silver medals of the First League and for the first time in history gained the right to compete in the Premier League.

However, on 1 June 2017, it was announced that Desna was denied in receiving license to play in the top division. The argument was that the club is not able to provide guarantees for an adequate financing of infrastructure. In reality, the problem was not only in half-shady financial irregularities, but also shady ownership of the club. The license was received by NK Veres Rivne, the third-placed team during the last season in the second-tier division.

Both clubs FC Desna Chernihiv and NK Veres Rivne did not play at their home stadiums in the 2016–17 Ukrainian First League. The first one played in Kyiv at the Obolon Arena, while the other one played in Varash, at the Izotop Stadium of the Rivne Nuclear Power Plant. The administration of Desna released a letter of protest before a meeting of FFU representative. On 2 June 2017, it was announced about the final composition of the clubs and calendar for the upcoming season. In October 2017 the club's ownership was passed to Volodymyr Levin. According to the results of the 2017/18 season Desna won the bronze medals of the First League and gained the right to compete in the Premier League through the play-offs against Zirka Kropyvnytskyi. The captain Denys Favorov was elected Best Player Ukrainian First League in the season 2017–18. The team got into the Quarterfinals of the Ukrainian Cup in the season 2017–18 against Dynamo Kyiv.

Europa League third qualifying round 
In 2018 the club signed the experienced goalkeeper Yevhen Past and in January 2020 the Estonian international experience Joonas Tamm and the club during the season 2019–20 got again into the Quarterfinals of the Ukrainian Cup for the second time of the history of the club.

In Premier League in the season 2019–20, Desna got the 4th place, through the play-offs for the Championship round table, winning also against club like Dynamo Kyiv in Kyiv at the NSC Olimpiyskiy on 15 September 2019 for 1–2 (Vladyslav Kalitvintsev 40', Artem Besyedin 49, Oleksandr Filippov 56).

Due to the COVID-19 pandemic in Ukraine and based on resolutions of the Cabinet of Ukraine and the UAF Executive Committee, on 11 March 2020 the UPL adopted a decision to conduct games of the league's championship as well as under-21 and under-19 championships without spectators until 3 April 2020 (the first two rounds of the season's second stage).

FC Desna Chernihiv, started the play-offs for the Championship round table, 15 March 2020 with Dynamo Kyiv in Kyiv drawing 1–1 at the NSC Olimpiyskiy. Due to pandemic situation worldwide, the League was temporally suspended.

The play-off started again 30 May 2020 and FC Desna Chernihiv won away 0–2 against FC Kolos Kovalivka and 5–1 away against FC Oleksandriya on 14 June 2020. Next match Desna lost 3–2 against Shakhtar Donetsk 6 June 2020. Desna made incredible performance winning 5–1 away against FC Oleksandriya 15 June 2020. On 21 June 2020, the club lost 1–2 at home against Zorya Luhansk and one week later FC Desna won 3–2 at home against Dynamo Kyiv in an incredible match . On 5 July 2020 the club won 5–1 at home against FC Kolos Kovalivka and be the team that scored most goals during the play off

Wednesday 8 July 2020, Desna qualified mathematically for the Europa League third qualifying round, for the first time in the history of the Club since 1960, following the victory of the Ukrainian Cup by Dynamo Kyiv against Vorskla Poltava and being the third best attach and the third best defence in the season. Also Yevhen Past was the goalkeeper with most clean sheets in 11 matches together with the international Ukrainian goalkeeper Andriy Pyatov.

Fair Play prize of Ukrainian Premier League 
In summer 2020, the captain Denys Favorov, left the club after 4 years with big surprise of many people as the club didn't extend the contract and elected Ukrainian Footballer of the Year in 2020. The striker Oleksandr Filippov was sold for 1.5 million of euro, becoming the most expensive player sold by the club, also with some Italian clubs interested in the player. After the draw for the Europa League third qualifying round, Desna got the German team VfL Wolfsburg and on 24 September 2020 they lost 2–0 at the AOK Stadion.

In October 2020 Yukhym Konoplya (on loan from Shakhtar Donetsk), has been called for the Ukraine national football team, for friendly match against France and UEFA Nations League matches against Germany and Spain on 7, 10 and 13 October 2020 respectively, becoming the first player of playing in Desna Chernihiv, called in the Ukraine national team.

In January 2021, the team has won the Fair Play prize in the UPL as the best team in the season 2019–20.The award ceremony was attended by the President of the Ukrainian Football Association, UEFA Executive Committee member Andriy Pavelko, UAF First Vice President Oleh Protasov, UAF Referees Committee Chairman Luciano Luci, UPL Executive Director Yevhen Dyky and PFL President Oleksandr Kadenko.

In summer of 2021 the club fails to qualify for the cups and according with the president of the club, Volodymyr Levin, said that the club has a 4-month debt to the players for the payment of salaries and the management of the UPL club decided to cut the budget for the 2021/22 season. A number of players have left Desna. The club begins the rejuvenation of the team, leaving starting players who have made the history of the club and begins to develop the team's academy and choose some of Desna 2 players. The team was requalified and new young players has been added into the club with good results at the beginning of the season to the surprise of many people and the press. In September 2021, Vladyslav Kalitvintsev has been included in the reserve team of Ukraine national football team against Finland, becoming the first player belong to Desna to been called in the Ukraine national football team.

Infrastructure

Stadium
 
The team play in the Olympic sports training center "Chernihiv" (formerly Stadion Yuriya Gagarina). The Stadion Yuri Gagarin in Chernihiv was built in 1936 for 3,000 spectators in eastern portion of a city park (garden) that exists since 1804 and where previously was located residence of the Chernihiv Archbishops. During World War II, the Chernihiv Stadium was heavily damaged and in the 1950s was completely reconstructed, included stadium walls and two stands for 11,000 spectators. In 1961, it was named after the Russian Soviet cosmonaut Yuri Gagarin. On 25 May 1964, Gagarin in person attended the stadium. In the mid 1980s, the stadium capacity was increased to 14,000.

Training centre
Desna Chernihiv, train in the "Olympic sports training center" and sometime in Chernihiv Arena, which is belong of FC Chernihiv. Desna Chernihiv and the young brother team FC Chernihiv, want to build football fields and other sports infrastructure. Both plots are located in the ZAZ neighborhood near Kiltseva – Voloshkova – Kalinova – Dachna streets. The first has an area of 1.4794 hectares, its regulatory monetary value is ₴1,923,367.94. Based on the results of the bidding, the relevant agreement will be concluded by December 31, 2026. The area of the second plot is 3.9469 hectares, its normative monetary value is UAH 5,131,364.69. The agreement will be valid until December 31, 2025.

Youth, academy and reserves

The club has few reserve teams, the main one is FC Desna-2 Chernihiv, which in 2008 entered the professional leagues for the first time. The team had been competing in the Chernihivska Oblast competition and prepared themselves in the fourth-level 2008 Ukrainian Football Amateur League. The club has, the Youth Sports School called Yunist Chernihiv, where produced players like Andriy Yarmolenko. The academy of Desna, produced also Illya Shevtsov, which become the top scorer for the Ukrainian Premier League Reserves in the season 2019–20. In 2021, the Desna football club is working on the creation of a children's football academy in Chernihiv.There is already a land plot for this and the club began the implementation of the long-standing idea and dream of our fans – the creation of a children's academy. At the site where the academy will be located, preliminary design work is currently underway. Then the adaptation of the project to the terrain with the construction work should begin in the spring 2021.

Desna's supporters
The fans of FC Desna Chernihiv are called Ultras Desna called also North Block, they are quite famous for supporting and following their team, at home and away. When the team enter in the stadium they can expect a warm welcome by their fans. The fans they always support the team until the end of every single match. During FC Desna Chernihiv matches, the fan area is a strip of white and blue colors. On 12 March 2020 during the Quarterfinal match against Vorskla Poltava, the match was played behind closed doors due to quarantine in Ukraine during COVID-19 pandemic and "Ultra Desna" supported the team outside the Stadion Yuri Gagarin. They are also active in many social media like the Russian-based Telegram Channel. There are fans outside Ukraine, like in Italy but there is also an Australian fan of Desna called Ian Brash who constantly travels from England to Ukraine to see the team playing at home and away since 2016  supporting the club.

Honours and distinctions

Domestic competitions
Ukrainian First League
  Runners-up (1): 2016–17

Ukrainian Second League
  Winners (3): 1996–97 (Group A), 2005–06 (Group A), 2012–13 (Group A) (record)
  Runners-up (4): 2000–01 (Group C), 2003–04 (Group C), 2004–05 (Group C), 2011–12 (Group A)

Cup of the Ukrainian SSR
  Semifinal (1) 1990

Championship of the Ukrainian SSR
    Runners-up (2): 1982, 1966
    Runners-up (1): 1968

Ukrainian Amateur Football Championship	
   Winners (1): 1976 as Khimik Chernihiv

Ukrainian First League
  Winners (1) Fair Play award 2017–18 season

Ukrainian Premier League
  Winners (1) Fair Play award 2019–20 season

Individual Player & Coach awards
Ukrainian Footballer of the Year
 Denys Favorov 2020 (Desna, Zorya)

Best Coach of Ukrainian First League
 Oleksandr Ryabokon 2016–17

Best Player of Ukrainian First League
 Denys Favorov 2017–18

Top Scorer of Ukrainian Second League
 Oleksandr Kozhemyachenko: 2010–11 (12 goals)
 Oleksandr Kozhemyachenko: 2004–05 (20 goals)
 Oleksandr Kozhemyachenko: 2005–06 (21 goals)

Top Scorer Ukrainian Premier League Reserves (Under 21)
 Illya Shevtsov 2019–20

Crest and colours

Crest

The crest of the club, which was created in early 2008 contained an image of an eagle from the coat of arms of Chernihiv and a sign of Chernihiv prince Mstyslav Volodymyrovych.

The modern crest, made in the traditional white and blue colors of the Desna, was presented on July 27, 2016. In the development of the emblem the fans of the team took part. On the shield is a stylized eagle – the main element of the city coat of arms of Chernihiv. The image of the eagle was used as a symbol of Chernihiv princes from the middle of the 10th century. The golden cross, which holds the eagle, symbolizes the importance of Christianity in the history of the city, one of the main spiritual centers of Ukraine. Vertical blue and white stripes on the emblem are based on the form in which the players of the Desna have been playing since 1962. The inscription "Desna" is made in a font that was used on the previous emblems of the club.

There are old crests of the club:

Colours
The historical colours of Desna are white and blue. In the 1961 season, white and blue were used as home colours, green and blue as away colours. In a friendly match against Hammarby on 22 October 1961, Desna players wore red shirts and blue shorts.

Players

Current squad

Other players under contract

Out on loan

Reserve team
For the reserve squads, see Desna-2 Chernihiv and Desna-3 Chernihiv

Records

Most goals

Most appearances

Coaches and administration

Managers and presidents

USSR

Ukraine

League and cup history

Soviet Union
{|class="wikitable"
|-bgcolor="#efefef"
! Season
! Div.
! Pos.
! Pl.
! W
! D
! L
! GS
! GA
! P
!Domestic Cup
!colspan=2|Europe
!Notes
|-bgcolor=LightCyan
|align=center|1960
|align=center|Class B, Ukraine I
|align=center|16
|align=center|32
|align=center|5
|align=center|6
|align=center|21
|align=center|29
|align=center|62
|align=center|16
|align=center|
|align=center|
|align=center|
|align=center|Relegation playoff
|-bgcolor=LightCyan
|align=center rowspan="2"|1961
|align=center|Class B, Ukraine I 
|align=center|5
|align=center|34 
|align=center|13 
|align=center|13 
|align=center|8 
|align=center|50 
|align=center|49 
|align=center|39
|align=center rowspan="2"|UkSSR zone 1, Final
|align=center|
|align=center|
|align=center rowspan=2|Relegation playoff
|-bgcolor=LightCyan
|align=center|9–10 pos.
|align=center|10
|align=center|2
|align=center|0
|align=center|1
|align=center|1
|align=center|2
|align=center|4
|align=center|1
|align=center|
|align=center|
|-bgcolor=LightCyan
|align=center rowspan="2"|1962
|align=center|Class B, Ukraine III 
|align=center|4
|align=center|24 
|align=center|10 
|align=center|8 
|align=center|6 
|align=center|40 
|align=center|33 
|align=center|28
|align=center rowspan="2"|UkSSR zone,  finals 
|align=center|
|align=center|
|align=center|Relegation playoff
|-bgcolor=LightCyan
|align=center|7–17 pos.
|align=center|13
|align=center|10
|align=center|1
|align=center|7
|align=center|2
|align=center|7
|align=center|9
|align=center|9
|align=center|
|align=center|
|align=center bgcolor=red|Relegated
|-bgcolor=lightgrey
|align=center colspan="14"|In 1963 Class A was expanded with an extra tier, Class B was downgraded
|-bgcolor=PowderBlue
|align=center rowspan="2"|1963
|align=center|Class B, Ukraine I 
|align=center|11
|align=center|38 
|align=center|12 
|align=center|12 
|align=center|14 
|align=center|35 
|align=center|42 
|align=center|36
|align=center rowspan="2"|UkSSR zone 1,  finals 
|align=center|
|align=center|
|align=center|
|-bgcolor=PowderBlue
|align=center|21–22 pos.
|align=center|21
|align=center|2
|align=center|1
|align=center|0
|align=center|1
|align=center|4
|align=center|3
|align=center|2
|align=center|
|align=center|
|align=center|
|-bgcolor=PowderBlue
|align=center rowspan="2"|1964
|align=center|Class B, Ukraine I 
|align=center|11
|align=center|30 
|align=center|8 
|align=center|10 
|align=center|12 
|align=center|23 
|align=center|31 
|align=center|26
|align=center rowspan="2"|UkSSR zone 1, Final
|align=center|
|align=center|
|align=center|
|-bgcolor=PowderBlue
|align=center|25–30 pl.
|align=center|25
|align=center|10
|align=center|4
|align=center|5
|align=center|1
|align=center|15
|align=center|8
|align=center|13
|align=center|
|align=center|
|align=center|
|-bgcolor=PowderBlue
|align=center rowspan="2"|1965
|align=center|Class B, Ukraine I 
|align=center|9
|align=center|30 
|align=center|8 
|align=center|14 
|align=center|8 
|align=center|32 
|align=center|33 
|align=center|30
|align=center rowspan="2"| finals
|align=center|
|align=center|
|align=center|
|-bgcolor=PowderBlue
|align=center|19–24 pl.
|align=center|21
|align=center|10
|align=center|4
|align=center|2
|align=center|4
|align=center|13
|align=center|14
|align=center|10
|align=center|
|align=center|
|align=center|
|-bgcolor=PowderBlue
|align=center rowspan="2"|1966
|align=center|Class B, Ukraine I 
|align=center|2
|align=center|38 
|align=center|19 
|align=center|11 
|align=center|8 
|align=center|56 
|align=center|32 
|align=center|49
|align=center rowspan="2"| finals
|align=center|
|align=center|
|align=center|
|-bgcolor=PowderBlue
|align=center|3–4 pl.
|align=center|4
|align=center|2
|align=center|0
|align=center|1
|align=center|1
|align=center|0
|align=center|2
|align=center|1
|align=center|
|align=center|
|align=center|
|-bgcolor=PowderBlue
|align=center|1967
|align=center|Class B, Ukraine I
|align=center|8
|align=center|40
|align=center|17
|align=center|11
|align=center|12
|align=center|44
|align=center|33
|align=center|45
|align=center|UkSSR zone 1,  finals 
|align=center|
|align=center|
|align=center|
|-bgcolor=PowderBlue
|align=center rowspan="2"|1968
|align=center|Class B, Ukraine II 
|align=center|3
|align=center|40 
|align=center|24 
|align=center|6 
|align=center|10 
|align=center|50 
|align=center|27 
|align=center|54
|align=center rowspan="2"|Crimea zone, Final
|align=center|
|align=center|
|align=center|
|-bgcolor=PowderBlue
|align=center|Final UkSSR
|align=center|4
|align=center|7
|align=center|3
|align=center|2
|align=center|2
|align=center|6
|align=center|6
|align=center|8
|align=center|
|align=center|
|align=center bgcolor=lightgreen|Promoted
|-bgcolor=LightCyan
|align=center|1969
|align=center|Class A, Group 2, Subgroup 3
|align=center|18
|align=center|42
|align=center|11
|align=center|14
|align=center|17
|align=center|30
|align=center|59
|align=center|36
|align=center| finals
|align=center|
|align=center|
|align=center bgcolor=red|Relegated
|-bgcolor=PowderBlue
|align=center|1970
|align=center|Class A, Group 2, Zone 1
|align=center|11
|align=center|42
|align=center|17
|align=center|10
|align=center|15
|align=center|43
|align=center|45
|align=center|44
|align=center| Finals
|align=center|
|align=center|
|align=center bgcolor=pink|Disbanded
|-bgcolor=gray
|align=center colspan="14"|Desna was disbanded in 1971–76
|-bgcolor=PowderBlue
|align=center|1977
|align=center|Second League, Zone 2
|align=center|14
|align=center|44
|align=center|11
|align=center|16
|align=center|17
|align=center|34
|align=center|42
|align=center|38
|align=center|
|align=center|
|align=center|
|align=center|
|-bgcolor=PowderBlue
|align=center|1978
|align=center|Second League, Zone 2
|align=center|11
|align=center|44
|align=center|16
|align=center|13
|align=center|15
|align=center|37
|align=center|33
|align=center|45
|align=center|
|align=center|
|align=center|
|align=center|
|-bgcolor=PowderBlue
|align=center|1979
|align=center|Second League, Zone 2
|align=center|17
|align=center|46
|align=center|13
|align=center|12
|align=center|21
|align=center|37
|align=center|57
|align=center|38
|align=center|
|align=center|
|align=center|
|align=center|
|-bgcolor=PowderBlue
|align=center|1980
|align=center|Second League, Zone 5
|align=center|8
|align=center|44
|align=center|18
|align=center|13
|align=center|13
|align=center|50
|align=center|29
|align=center|49
|align=center|
|align=center|
|align=center|
|align=center|
|-bgcolor=PowderBlue
|align=center|1981
|align=center|Second League, Zone 5
|align=center|12
|align=center|44
|align=center|13
|align=center|15
|align=center|16
|align=center|48
|align=center|38
|align=center|41
|align=center|
|align=center|
|align=center|
|align=center|
|-bgcolor=PowderBlue
|align=center|1982
|align=center|Second League, Zone 6
|align=center bgcolor=silver|2
|align=center|46
|align=center|26
|align=center|10
|align=center|10
|align=center|64
|align=center|38
|align=center|62
|align=center|
|align=center|
|align=center|
|align=center|
|-bgcolor=PowderBlue
|align=center|1983
|align=center|Second League, Zone 6
|align=center|23
|align=center|50
|align=center|16
|align=center|8
|align=center|26
|align=center|26
|align=center|50
|align=center|38
|align=center|
|align=center|
|align=center|
|align=center|
|-bgcolor=PowderBlue
|align=center rowspan="2"|1984
|align=center|Second League, Zone 2, Group 1 
|align=center|11
|align=center|24 
|align=center|6 
|align=center|5 
|align=center|13 
|align=center|24 
|align=center|39 
|align=center|17
|align=center|
|align=center|
|align=center|
|align=center|
|-bgcolor=PowderBlue
|align=center|Final 13–26 pl.
|align=center|20
|align=center|14
|align=center|6
|align=center|3
|align=center|5
|align=center|20
|align=center|24
|align=center|15
|align=center|
|align=center|
|align=center|
|align=center|
|-bgcolor=PowderBlue
|align=center rowspan="2"|1985
|align=center|Second League, Zone 2, Group 1 
|align=center|10
|align=center|26 
|align=center|7 
|align=center|6 
|align=center|13 
|align=center|26 
|align=center|36 
|align=center|20
|align=center|
|align=center|
|align=center|
|align=center|
|-bgcolor=PowderBlue
|align=center|Final 15–28 pl.
|align=center|23
|align=center|14
|align=center|6
|align=center|3
|align=center|5
|align=center|16
|align=center|19
|align=center|15
|align=center|
|align=center|
|align=center|
|align=center|
|-bgcolor=PowderBlue
|align=center rowspan="2"|1986
|align=center|Second League, Zone 2, Group 1
|align=center|10
|align=center|26 
|align=center|8 
|align=center|7 
|align=center|11 
|align=center|25 
|align=center|31 
|align=center|23
|align=center|
|align=center|
|align=center|
|align=center|
|-bgcolor=PowderBlue
|align=center|Final 15–28 pl.
|align=center|23
|align=center|14
|align=center|5
|align=center|3
|align=center|6
|align=center|12
|align=center|13
|align=center|13
|align=center|
|align=center|
|align=center|
|align=center|
|-bgcolor=PowderBlue
|align=center|1987
|align=center|Second League, Zone 6
|align=center|24
|align=center|52
|align=center|11
|align=center|17
|align=center|24
|align=center|48
|align=center|80
|align=center|39
|align=center|
|align=center|
|align=center|
|align=center|
|-bgcolor=PowderBlue
|align=center|1988
|align=center|Second League, Zone 6
|align=center|21
|align=center|50
|align=center|14
|align=center|14
|align=center|22
|align=center|42
|align=center|59
|align=center|42
|align=center|
|align=center|
|align=center|
|align=center|
|-bgcolor=PowderBlue
|align=center|1989
|align=center|Second League, Zone 5
|align=center|17
|align=center|42
|align=center|14
|align=center|8
|align=center|20
|align=center|39
|align=center|54
|align=center|36
|align=center|
|align=center|
|align=center|
|align=center bgcolor=red|Relegated
|-bgcolor=SteelBlue
|align=center|1990
|align=center|Soviet Lower Second League, Zone 1
|align=center|12
|align=center|36
|align=center|13
|align=center|6
|align=center|17
|align=center|35
|align=center|39
|align=center|32
|align=center bgcolor=tan|UkSSR Cup,  finals
|align=center|
|align=center|
|align=center|
|-bgcolor=SteelBlue
|align=center|1991
|align=center|Soviet Lower Second League, Zone 1
|align=center|13
|align=center|50
|align=center|20
|align=center|9
|align=center|21
|align=center|59
|align=center|59
|align=center|49
|align=center|UkSSR Cup,  finals
|align=center|
|align=center|
|align=center|
|}

Ukraine

{|class="wikitable"
|-bgcolor="#efefef"
! Season
! Div.
! Pos.
! Pl.
! W
! D
! L
! GS
! GA
! P
!Domestic Cup
!colspan=2|Europe
!Notes
|-bgcolor=LightCyan
|align=center|1992
|align=center|2nd "A"
|align=center|5
|align=center|26
|align=center|11
|align=center|7
|align=center|8
|align=center|23
|align=center|24
|align=center|29
|align=center| finals
|align=center|
|align=center|
|align=center|
|-bgcolor=LightCyan
|align=center|1992–93
|align=center|2nd
|align=center|19
|align=center|42
|align=center|13
|align=center|9
|align=center|20
|align=center|42
|align=center|49
|align=center|35
|align=center| finals
|align=center|
|align=center|
|align=center|
|-bgcolor=LightCyan
|align=center|1993–94
|align=center|2nd
|align=center|20
|align=center|38
|align=center|7
|align=center|10
|align=center|21
|align=center|29
|align=center|53
|align=center|24
|align=center| finals
|align=center|
|align=center|
|align=center bgcolor=red|Relegated
|-bgcolor=PowderBlue
|align=center|1994–95
|align=center|3rd
|align=center|11
|align=center|42
|align=center|17
|align=center|7
|align=center|18
|align=center|44
|align=center|43
|align=center|58
|align=center| finals
|align=center|
|align=center|
|align=center|
|-bgcolor=PowderBlue
|align=center|1995–96
|align=center|3rd "A"
|align=center|7
|align=center|40
|align=center|21
|align=center|9
|align=center|10
|align=center|55
|align=center|30
|align=center|72
|align=center| finals
|align=center|
|align=center|
|align=center|
|-bgcolor=PowderBlue
|align=center|1996–97
|align=center|3rd "A"
|align=center bgcolor=gold|1
|align=center|30
|align=center|26
|align=center|6
|align=center|4
|align=center|39
|align=center|12
|align=center|66
|align=center| finals Second stage
|align=center|
|align=center|
|align=center bgcolor=lightgreen|Promoted
|-bgcolor=LightCyan
|align=center|1997–98
|align=center|2nd
|align=center|15
|align=center|42
|align=center|14
|align=center|12
|align=center|16
|align=center|45
|align=center|53
|align=center|54
|align=center| finals
|align=center|
|align=center|
|align=center|
|-bgcolor=LightCyan
|align=center|1998–99
|align=center|2nd
|align=center|19
|align=center|38
|align=center|7
|align=center|6
|align=center|25
|align=center|28
|align=center|60
|align=center|27
|align=center| finals
|align=center|
|align=center|
|align=center bgcolor=red|Relegated
|-bgcolor=PowderBlue
|align=center|1999-00
|align=center|3rd "C"
|align=center|9
|align=center|26
|align=center|11
|align=center|5
|align=center|10
|align=center|27
|align=center|32
|align=center|38
|align=center| finals Second League Cup
|align=center|
|align=center|
|align=center|
|-bgcolor=PowderBlue
|align=center|2000–01
|align=center|3rd "C"
|align=center bgcolor=silver|2
|align=center|30
|align=center|18
|align=center|5
|align=center|7
|align=center|66
|align=center|29
|align=center|59
|align=center| finals Second League Cup
|align=center|
|align=center|
|align=center|
|-bgcolor=PowderBlue
|align=center|2001–02
|align=center|3rd "C"
|align=center|4
|align=center|34
|align=center|18
|align=center|6
|align=center|10
|align=center|57
|align=center|43
|align=center|60
|align=center|Round 1
|align=center|
|align=center|
|align=center|
|-bgcolor=PowderBlue
|align=center|2002–03
|align=center|3rd "C"
|align=center bgcolor=tan|3
|align=center|28
|align=center|19
|align=center|1
|align=center|8
|align=center|36
|align=center|25
|align=center|58
|align=center| finals
|align=center|
|align=center|
|align=center|
|-bgcolor=PowderBlue
|align=center|2003–04
|align=center|3rd "C"
|align=center bgcolor=silver|2
|align=center|30
|align=center|23
|align=center|5
|align=center|2
|align=center|67
|align=center|25
|align=center|74
|align=center| finals
|align=center|
|align=center|
|align=center|
|-bgcolor=PowderBlue
|align=center|2004–05
|align=center|3rd "C"
|align=center bgcolor=silver|2
|align=center|28
|align=center|21
|align=center|4
|align=center|3
|align=center|59
|align=center|26
|align=center|67
|align=center| finals
|align=center|
|align=center|
|align=center|
|-bgcolor=PowderBlue
|align=center|2005–06
|align=center|3rd "A"
|align=center bgcolor=gold|1
|align=center|28
|align=center|24
|align=center|2
|align=center|2
|align=center|76
|align=center|13
|align=center|74
|align=center| finals
|align=center|
|align=center|
|align=center bgcolor=lightgreen|Promoted
|-bgcolor=LightCyan
|align=center|2006–07
|align=center|2nd
|align=center|14
|align=center|36
|align=center|11
|align=center|8
|align=center|17
|align=center|51
|align=center|58
|align=center|41
|align=center| finals
|align=center|
|align=center|
|align=center|
|-bgcolor=LightCyan
|align=center|2007–08
|align=center|2nd
|align=center|4
|align=center|38
|align=center|20
|align=center|7
|align=center|11
|align=center|61
|align=center|44
|align=center|67
|align=center| finals
|align=center|
|align=center|
|align=center|
|-bgcolor=LightCyan
|align=center|2008–09
|align=center|2nd
|align=center|7
|align=center|32
|align=center|13
|align=center|8
|align=center|11
|align=center|31
|align=center|33
|align=center|47
|align=center| finals
|align=center|
|align=center|
|align=center|
|-bgcolor=LightCyan
|align=center|2009–10
|align=center|2nd
|align=center|8
|align=center|34
|align=center|12
|align=center|12
|align=center|10
|align=center|38
|align=center|30
|align=center|48
|align=center| finals
|align=center|
|align=center|
|align=center bgcolor=red|Relegated
|-bgcolor=PowderBlue
|align=center|2010–11
|align=center|3rd "A"
|align=center|5
|align=center|22
|align=center|12
|align=center|4
|align=center|6
|align=center|38
|align=center|24
|align=center|40
|align=center| finals
|align=center|
|align=center|
|align=center|
|-bgcolor=PowderBlue
|align=center|2011–12
|align=center|3rd "A"
|align=center bgcolor=silver|2
|align=center|26
|align=center|18
|align=center|5
|align=center|3
|align=center|48
|align=center|19
|align=center|59
|align=center| finals
|align=center|
|align=center|
|align=center|Play-off
|-bgcolor=PowderBlue
|align=center rowspan="2"|2012–13
|align=center|3rd "A"
|align=center|1
|align=center|20 		
|align=center|14 		
|align=center|6 		  	
|align=center|0 		  	 	
|align=center|35 		
|align=center|12  	
|align=center|48
| align="center" rowspan="2" | finals
|align=center|
|align=center|
|align=center|
|-bgcolor=PowderBlue
|align=center|3rd "1"
|align=center bgcolor=gold|1
|align=center|30 	
|align=center|20 	
|align=center|9 	
|align=center|1 		
|align=center|55 		 	 	 	
|align=center|22 		 	 	 	
|align=center|69
|align=center|
|align=center|
|align=center bgcolor=lightgreen|Promoted
|-bgcolor=LightCyan
|align=center|2013–14
|align=center|2nd
|align=center|5
|align=center|30
|align=center|14
|align=center|2
|align=center|14
|align=center|33
|align=center|27
|align=center|44
|align=center| finals
|align=center|
|align=center|
|align=center|
|-bgcolor=LightCyan
|align=center|2014–15
|align=center|2nd
|align=center|5
|align=center|30
|align=center|12
|align=center|11
|align=center|7
|align=center|44
|align=center|27
|align=center|47
|align=center| finals
|align=center|
|align=center|
|align=center|
|-bgcolor=LightCyan
|align=center|2015–16
|align=center|2nd
|align=center|8
|align=center|30 	
|align=center|11 	
|align=center|7 	
|align=center|12 	
|align=center|30 	
|align=center|29 
|align=center|40
|align=center| finals
|align=center|
|align=center|
|align=center|
|-bgcolor=LightCyan
|align=center|2016–17
|align=center|2nd
|align=center bgcolor=silver|2
|align=center|34 
|align=center|22 	
|align=center|8 	
|align=center|4 		
|align=center|55 	
|align=center|23 	
|align=center|74
|align=center| finals
|align=center|
|align=center|
|align=center|Denied Promotion
|-bgcolor=LightCyan
|align=center|2017–18
|align=center|2nd
|align=center bgcolor=tan|3
|align=center|34
|align=center|22
|align=center|5
|align=center|7
|align=center|71
|align=center|25	
|align=center|71
|align=center| finals
|align=center|
|align=center|
|align=center bgcolor=lightgreen|Promoted
|-bgcolor=White
|align=center|2018–19
|align=center|1st
|align=center|8
|align=center|32
|align=center|12
|align=center|5
|align=center|15
|align=center|35
|align=center|41
|align=center|41
|align=center| finals
|align=center|
|align=center|
|align=center|
|-bgcolor=White
|align=center|2019–20
|align=center|1st
|align=center|4
|align=center|32
|align=center|17
|align=center|5
|align=center|10
|align=center|59
|align=center|33
|align=center|56
|align=center| finals
|align=center|
|align=center|
|align=center|
|-bgcolor=White
|align=center|2020–21
|align=center|1st
|align=center|6
|align=center|26
|align=center|10
|align=center|8
|align=center|8
|align=center|38
|align=center|32	
|align=center|38
|align=center| finals
|align=center|EL
|align=center|
|align=center|
|-bgcolor=White
|align=center|2021–22
|align=center|1st
|align=center|7
|align=center|18
|align=center|7
|align=center|4
|align=center|7
|align=center|22
|align=center|27
|align=center|25
|align=center| finals
|align=center|
|align=center|
|align=center|
|}

1 tier – 3 seasons (Ukraine)
2 tier – 4 seasons (USSR) + 14 seasons (Ukraine)
3 tier – 20 seasons (USSR) + 13 seasons (Ukraine)
4 tier – 2 seasons (USSR)

European record 
Desna qualified for European football for the first time in the 2020–21 season, where they made their debut in the Europa League.

UEFA club rankings

As of 23 April 2022.

See also
 List of sport teams in Chernihiv

Notes

References

External links

Official website 

Media
Telegram
Vkontakte
Facebook
Twitter
Youtube
Instagram

 
Football clubs in Chernihiv
Football clubs in Chernihiv Oblast
Ukrainian Premier League clubs
Association football clubs established in 1960
1960 establishments in Ukraine
Football clubs in the Ukrainian Soviet Socialist Republic
Avanhard (sports society)